Triple Brutal is the third album by the parody metal band, Austrian Death Machine. The album feature members of Carnifex, The Faceless, Bleeding Through, and Impending Doom. The album was to be released by Metal Blade Records, but the label refused to release the album, so Lambesis signed to Artery Recordings.

Critical reception

New Noise Magazine writer Jesse Striewski wrote "...those who enjoy their metal laced with an abundance of quotes from cheesy action flicks should not be let down." Gregory Heaney of AllMusic wrote "Although the schtick can wear a bit thin at times, musically Triple Brutal is a solid album ready-made for the mosh pit, and those looking to get some cathartic metal that doesn't take itself too seriously, or maybe just a little more of The Governator, into their lives won't be disappointed." D.X. Ferris of MetalSucks wrote "Unlike its predecessors, Triple Brutal does not sound like a funny guy and his jovial friends enjoying themselves. Compared to Double Brutal, B3 is grittier, but in a way that seems at odds with the band’s core concept. Regardless of your position on Lambesis, Triple Brutal isn’t going to make you laugh. And if an album full of Schwarzenegger impressions and skits isn’t fun, what’s the point?" John Jackson of The Metal Resource reported "Overall, this is probably the best of the ADM albums from an overall song quality standpoint.  Nothing will ever top hearing “Get to the Choppa” for the first time, but from start to finish, Triple Brutal is filled with fast, driving metal that can help anyone who is “looking a little bit like a noodle” get some “gymspiration” to get in “One More Rep”."

Controversy
The album was crowdfunded with several types of deals; one such deal was a workout with frontman Tim Lambesis and to receive a copy of the album. This was prior to Tim attempting to hire an undercover police officer as a hitman to murder his wife.

Track listing

Personnel
Austrian Death Machine
 Tim Lambesis - Vocals
 Chad Ackerman a.k.a. Ahhhnold - Ahhhnold Vocals

Addition musicians
Vocals
 Jamey Jasta - Vocals (track 5)
 Ash Avildsen - Vocals (track 4)
 Jon Cooke - Vocals (track 12)
 Lorenzo "The Main Event" Antonucci	Vocals (track 7), Songwriting (track 7)

Guitars
 Kevin Schwartz - Lead Guitars (track 5)
 Wes Hauch - Lead Guitars (track 2)
 Mark MacDonald - Lead Guitars (tracks 3, 18)
 Chris Storey - Lead Guitars (track 6)
 Dan Palmer - Lead Guitars (track 5)
 Doc Coyle - Lead Guitars (track 8)
 Sean Swafford	- Lead Guitars (track 7)
 Jason Suecof - Lead Guitars (track 17)
 James "JP" Gericke - Rhythm Guitars, Bass, Songwriting (tracks 5, 9)

Drums
 Brandon Trahan - Drums (tracks 1-12, 14-18)
 Christian Bass - Drums (track 13)

Production
 Alan Douches - Mastering
 Elmo Arteaga	- Assistant Engineering
 Daniel Castleman - Producing, Engineering, Mixing
 John Boecklin	- Songwriting (track 2)
 Jordan Mancino - Songwriting (track 6)
 Josh Gilbert - Songwriting (tracks 6, 11)
 Dave Nassie - Songwriting (track 4)
 Alexander Dietz - Songwriting (track 13)
 Ryan Glisan - Songwriting (track 12)
 Ed Repka - Cover art

References

External links
 

2014 albums
Austrian Death Machine albums
Artery Recordings albums